{{DISPLAYTITLE:C20H24O3}}
The molecular formula C20H24O3 (molar mass: 312.40 g/mol) may refer to:

 Estrone acetate
 Ethinyl estriol (EE3), or 17α-ethynylestriol
 Trenbolone acetate

Molecular formulas